Wynnum North may refer to:

 Wynnum, Queensland
 Wynnum North railway station